Riau Residency was an administrative territorial entity of the Dutch East Indies.

It covered the southern half of Riau Province.

References

Residencies of the Dutch East Indies